Botany Bay, Monmouthshire is an area in the Wye Valley in Wales, above the village of Tintern. It is the location of a Gwent Scouts camp site covering .

References

Geography of Monmouthshire